Zburător  or sburător (Romanian word meaning 'flyer') is a supernatural being in Romanian folklore, described as a "roving spirit who makes love to maidens by night".

General description 
The zburător is also likened to an incubus, and described as a malevolent demon active in a "oniric-erotic" manner, i.e., visiting women in their dreams in the guise of a handsome young man.

The zburător is otherwise referred to as a zmeu (another dragon-like creature) in some regions, though perhaps perceived to have more human-like aspects than the zmeu.

History of lore 
Dimitrie Cantemir, writing about the myth concerning it in Descriptio Moldaviae (1714–1716). stated that the "zburator" meant "flyer", and according to the beliefs of the Moldavan it was "a ghost, a young, handsome man who comes in the middle of the night at women, especially recently married ones and does indecent things with them, although he cannot be seen by other people, not even by the ones who waylay him".

A literary reworking of the myth later appeared in the romantic poem by Ion Heliade Rădulescu Zburătorul ('The Flyer/Flying Incubus', 1843), and the "incubus" with flowing black hair visiting a young girl and inducing her erotic awakening. The myth reappears in the late romantic literature, in poems such as Călin (file de poveste) (Călin (story pages)) and Luceafărul (The Evening Star) (1884) by Romanian poet Mihai Eminescu.

The zburător (sburător ) myth became one of the four fundamental myths in Romanian folk poetry according to the framework of George Călinescu (1941).

Explanatory notes

References 
Citations

Bibliography

  

Romanian mythology
Romanian legendary creatures